Michele Rüfenacht (born September 15, 1959) is a retired decathlete from Switzerland, who finished in tenth place (7924 points) at the 1984 Summer Olympics in Los Angeles, California. He is a three-time national champion (1980, 1984 and 1987) in the men's decathlon.

Achievements

References

 GBRathletics
 1984 Year List

1959 births
Living people
Swiss decathletes
Athletes (track and field) at the 1984 Summer Olympics
Olympic athletes of Switzerland
Place of birth missing (living people)